is a Japanese nuclear-chemist known for his work on cold fusion. He was a former assistant professor teaching the Atomic Power Environmental Materials program at Hokkaido University. 
He was also a member of Energy Environmental Institute of Engineering at Hokkaido University until 2009.

Early life
Mizuno graduated from the Department of Applied Physics, Hokkaido University, Faculty of Engineering in March 1968. In March 1970, he graduated with a master's degree from the Department of Applied Physics, Hokkaido University, Faculty of Engineering. In April 1972 he completed his doctorate degree in Engineering at Hokkaido University, Faculty of Engineering, Department of Engineering. In March 1976, he received his doctorate in Engineering for "Study on formation process of hydride on the surface of Ti by d, n reaction” Teaching; Atomic Engineering, Corrosion, X-rays analysis, Electron microscope, Exercise: Mathematics, Physical Engineering.

Awards
He was awarded The International Society for Condensed Matter Nuclear Science Prizes (Giuliano Preparata medal) in 2004 from The International Society for Condensed Matter Nuclear Science (ISCMNS). The ISCMNS is the organizer of a conference and a workshop on cold fusion and related topics.

Publications
"Sorption of Hydrogen On and In Hydrogen Absorbing Metal in Electrochemical Environments" (Plenum Press) 
"An understanding of the environment, Global environment and the human life” (Sankyo Publishing, in 2006) 
"Low Energy Nuclear Reactions Sourcebook" (American Chemical Society, in 2008) 
"Nuclear Transmutation: The Reality of Cold Fusion" (Infinite Energy Press, in 1998)

Academic societies
 The International Society for Condensed Matter Nuclear Science 
 International Hydrogen Energy Society 
 International Institute of Aeronautics and Astronautics 
 Atomic Energy Society of Japan 
 Japan Society of Applied Physics
 Japan Cold Fusion Research Society

Research activities
Electrochemical, metallurgy, nuclear reaction in condensed matter, elucidation of the peculiar behavior of hydrogen in the metal, hydrogen penetration in metals, hydrogen embrittlement, hydrogen production, hydrogen separation and purification, power conversion of hydrogen, elucidation of hydrogen behavior, development of unique methods using hydrogen isotopes, studying the behavior of hydrogen on metal. Mizuno has also written Numerous books representing the interaction between hydrogen and the metals.

Extramural activities
Mizuno was involved in anti-terrorism measures as part of international safety measures for Hakodate Customs of Ministry of Finance.

See also
International Conference on Condensed Matter Nuclear Science

References

External links
Atomic Energy Society of Japan
Japan Society of Applied Physics

Living people
1945 births
Japanese chemists
Cold fusion
Hokkaido University alumni